Cheng Chia-tso (born 18 December 1962) is a Taiwanese weightlifter. He competed in the men's light heavyweight event at the 1988 Summer Olympics.

References

1962 births
Living people
Taiwanese male weightlifters
Olympic weightlifters of Taiwan
Weightlifters at the 1988 Summer Olympics
Place of birth missing (living people)